Jill Chaifetz (July 24, 1964 – February 2, 2006) was an American lawyer and children's rights advocate.

Chaifetz grew up in Hastings-on-Hudson, New York and graduated from Swarthmore College in 1986. She earned a Juris Doctor degree from the New York University School of Law three years later. 
In 1992, Chaifetz founded the Legal Services Center at The Door, a New York youth development agency. Through the center, she provided legal advice to young people, including many who were in foster care or homeless.

She headed Advocates for Children of New York from 1998 until her death from ovarian cancer at the age of 41.

School named in memoriam 
The Jill Chaifetz Transfer High School in the South Bronx, New York, is named after Chaifetz.

References 
 Toosi, Nahal (February 2, 2006). Jill Chaifetz, New York children's rights advocate, dies at 41. Associated Press
 Saulny, Susan (February 3, 2006). Jill Chaifetz, Advocate for Students' Rights, Dies at 41. New York Times.

1964 births
2006 deaths
New York (state) lawyers
Deaths from ovarian cancer
Swarthmore College alumni
New York University School of Law alumni
20th-century American women lawyers
20th-century American lawyers
21st-century American women